This article is about the phonology of Egyptian Arabic, also known as Cairene Arabic or Masri. It deals with the phonology and phonetics of Egyptian Arabic as well as the phonological development of child native speakers of the dialect. To varying degrees, it affects the pronunciation of Literary Arabic by native Egyptian Arabic speakers, as is the case for speakers of all other varieties of Arabic.

Phonemes

Consonants 

 Emphatic consonants are not commonly pronounced by illiterate speakers, which suggests that they are foreign and borrowed from Literary Arabic.
 Not all Egyptians can pronounce , which are mostly found in names or loanwords from languages like English, French and Persian, not Literary Arabic.
For example,  ('garage') is mostly pronounced , even by educated speakers.
   argues that emphatic  are additional consonants in Egyptian Arabic with marginal status.
In inherited words, the two phonemes regularly became  respectively.
 Non-Egyptianized loanwords having interdental consonants are approximated to the sibilants , .

Traditionally, the  interdental consonants  correspond to the Egyptian Arabic alveolar consonants . This is a feature common to some North African Arabic varieties and is attested in pre-modern, inherited words:
However, unlike other North African varieties, in Egyptian Arabic, the Literary Arabic interdental consonants  may correspond to sibilant consonants , particularly in more recent learned borrowings.

  > :  ('revolution'), from Literary  
  > :  ('broadcasting'), from Literary  
  > :  ('clitoris'), from Literary  

The linguist Janet C. E. Watson considers the following to be additional marginal consonants:
 The labial emphatics  and  also in loanwords; minimal pairs include  ('patriarch') vs  ('Paopi').

Classical Arabic * became  in Cairo (a feature shared with Levantine Arabic), but  is retained natively in some dialects to the west of the Nile Delta, outside of Alexandria, and has been reintroduced as a marginal phoneme from Standard Arabic, particularly relating to certain religious words, besides others such as those deriving from the root , relating to the intellect and culture..  may be used to distinguish between homophones, at least in mildly careful speech.

Allophones

Assimilation 
 Pharyngeal consonants before :
 The sequence  is more commonly pronounced , especially outside of careful speech. For example,  ('opened it(feminine)') → .
 The sequence  is more commonly pronounced  (or sometimes ), especially outside of careful speech.
 Velar fricatives before :
  → :  ('her brain') → 
  → :  ('[he] scolded her') → 
  before :
 Examples:  ('guilt') → ;  ('tube') → ;  ('Allenby') → .
 Sibilant consonants before :
 Word-finally:
For example,  ('didn't kiss') → 
For example,  ('wasn't corrupt') → .
 Intervocalic:
  → :  (Chipsy sac') → 

 Voicing and devoicing 
For some speakers, there is a voicing and devoicing assimilation for the following consonants:
 The sequence  is more commonly pronounced . For example,   ('didn't montage') → .

 Voiced:  → ;  → ;  → ;  → ;  → ;  → ;  → .
 Devoiced:  → ;  → ;  → ;  → ;  → ;  → ;  → .
When the input consonants are plosives differing only in voicing, the resultant assimilation will be complete.
 Examples on voicing assimilation:  ('he/it confused') → ;  ('outrun') → ;  ('suspected') → ;  ('utter') → ;  ('annoyed') → , a complete assimilation.
 Examples of devoicing assimilation:  ('society') → ;  ('ask forgiveness [of God]') → ;  ('took') → , a complete assimilation.

 Vowels 

The Egyptian Arabic vocalic system has changed from the Classical system. The system of vowels is as follows:

The vowel  is mostly from non-Semitic words if not in words with emphatic consonants.

The symbols  and  represent vowels that vary between close-mid  and near-close .

The final allophone of  varies in height between close  and close-mid  ( when centralized).

Like Maghrebi Arabic dialects, the non-open vowels tend to be more centralized in emphatic environment:

The front and back variants alternate in verbal and nominal paradigms in ways that are largely predictable, but the back variants  occur unpredictably in some lexical stems, especially those of non-Semitic origin. This is discussed more below.

For further discussion regarding vowel allophony in Egyptian Arabic, see .

Note that the diphthongs  and  also occur in the same environment, due to later deletion of unstressed vowels and resulting contraction, e.g. ('consultation') from Classical .

An epenthetic vowel is automatically inserted after the second of three or more consonants in a cluster to break up such clusters.
  ('a beautiful girl')
  ('my girl is beautiful')

 Emphasis spreading 
This process is known as emphasis spreading. The exact criteria of both "vicinity" and "emphatic consonant" varies depending on the individual speech variety.

In general, when emphasis spreading is triggered, the back variants  spread both forward and backward throughout the phonological word, including any morphological prefixes, suffixes and clitics. Note that this is different from many other Arabic varieties.  For example, in Moroccan Arabic, emphasis spreading usually travels no farther than the first full vowel on either side of the triggering consonant, and in many varieties of Levantine Arabic, emphasis spreading is of indefinite extent but is blocked by the phonemes .  Nevertheless, emphasis spreading is not completely reliable, and there is some free variation, especially in the pronunciation of prefixes and suffixes at some distance from the triggering consonant.

Some instances of  trigger emphasis spreading, while others do not. Currently, however, this is no more than a rough guideline, as many exceptions have since developed. This situation has led the linguist Janet C. E. Watson, who mostly studied the Yemeni Arabic dialects, to postulate the existence of two phonemes , which both surface as  but where only  triggers emphasis spreading. This analysis is not completely ideal in that these two resulting "phonemes"  alternate to a large extent (often unpredictably) in related forms derived from the same root.

Currently, to the extent that the emphatic or non-emphatic variant of  can be predicted, it works as follows: If  is adjacent to a vowel , emphasis-spreading is inhibited; otherwise, it occurs. The  is able to "see across" derivational but not inflectional morphemes. In this case, the derivational suffix  ('related to') creates a new lexical item in the language's vocabulary, and hence the stem is reevaluated for emphasis, with the non-low front vowel  triggering non-emphatic ; but the inflectional suffix  marking feminine singular does not create a new lexical item, and as a result the emphasis in the stem remains. (For these purposes, past and non-past forms of a verb are considered separate stems; hence alternations can occur like  'he continued' vs.  'he continues'.)

An emphasis-spreading  is usually adjacent to a low vowel  (which in turn is backed to ), but that is not necessary, and  also triggers emphasis-spreading: Examples  ('famous') → ,  ('project') → ,  ('thin') → .

It is also irrelevant for the operation of the numerous phonological adjustment rules (e.g. vowel lengthening, shortening and elision) in Egyptian Arabic. As a result, linguistic descriptions tend to subsume both under an archiphoneme . On the other hand, there are a number of lexical items in which "autonomous"  tend to occur irrespective of the presence of emphatic consonants. A few are in Arabic-derived words, e.g.

Different authors have proposed differing phonemic analyses of this situation:
Some have ignored the distinction entirely.
Generally, these phonetic explications are given for the examples in the section on phonology, and elsewhere whenever autonomous  occurs.

 Phonological processes 

 Vowel shortening 
   ('cheese')
 + →   ('we brought')
 + →   ('our pocket')
It is worth mentioning that vowel shortening is not made by rural speakers of Egyptian Arabic, whose form of speech is in decline.

 Vowel lengthening 
Final short vowels are lengthened when the stress is brought forward onto them as a result of the addition of a suffix.

 Vowel deletion (syncope) 
This also applies across word boundaries in cases of close syntactic connection.

 Vowel insertion (epenthesis) 
Three or more consonants are never allowed to appear together, including across a word boundary.  When such a situation would occur, an epenthetic  is inserted between the second and third consonants.

 Vowel elision and linking 
Unlike in most Arabic dialects, Egyptian Arabic has many words that logically begin with a vowel (e.g.  'I'), in addition to words that logically begin with a glottal stop (e.g.  'very', from Classical  'strong').  When pronounced in isolation, both types of words will be sounded with an initial glottal stop.  However, when following another word, words beginning with a vowel will often follow smoothly after the previous word, while words beginning with a glottal stop will always have the glottal stop sounded, e.g.:
  →   ('you [masc. sg.] are very big')

The phonetic pronunciations indicated above also demonstrate the phenomenon of linking, a normal process in Egyptian Arabic where syllable boundaries are adjusted across word boundaries to ensure that every syllable begins with exactly one consonant.

More specifically, elision occurs in the following circumstances:
When both vowels are the same, one will be elided.
When final  is followed by initial ,  is elided.
When any vowel is followed by initial ,  is elided.

 Multiple processes 

Multiple processes often apply simultaneously. An example of both insertion and deletion working together comes from the phrase  ('the girl is grown up'):
Example of insertion and deletion together:
Underlying representation: 
Epenthesis in CCC sequence: 
Deletion of  VCVCV: 
Surface realization: 
Compare  ('the boy is grown up'), where neither process applies.

Similarly, an example of both deletion and long-vowel shortening appears in the phrase  ('friend' fem.):
Underlying representation: 
Vowel shortening in VCC: 
Surface realization: 
Compare with Classical Arabic .

The operation of the various processes can often produce ambiguity:
  →  ('I [masc.] want to eat')
  →  →  ('I [fem.] want to eat')
Hence,  is ambiguous in regards to grammatical gender.

 Letter names 

The following table does not contain the characters which have the same names in Literary Arabic.

The final and separate  are written in the same way they are in Ottoman Turkish and Persian, but two different characters are used electronically.

 Phonotactics 

 Syllable structure 

Egyptian Arabic has the following five syllable types: CV, CVː, CVC, CVːC, and CVCC.

CVː, CVːC, and CVCC are long, or heavy, syllables. Long syllables bear primary stress, and there is only one stressed syllable per word.
Egyptian Arabic has a strong preference for heavy syllables, and various phonetic adjustments conspire to modify the surface pronunciation of connected speech towards the ideal of consisting entirely of heavy syllables.  Examples can be seen below:
Shortening of long vowels to avoid superheavy syllables (CVːC.CV → CVC.CV)
Lengthening of short vowels to avoid light stressed syllables (ˈCV.CV → ˈCVː.CV) or the increasingly rarer cases (ˈCV.CVC → ˈCVː.CVC) or avoiding light syllables and converting them into heavy syllables (CVC → CVːC)
Elision of short vowels to avoid sequences of superlight syllables (CV.CV.CV → CVC.CV)
Insertion of short vowels to avoid three-consonant sequences, which would result in a superheavy syllable (CVCC.CV or CVC.CCV → CVC.CV.CV)
Movement of syllable boundaries across word boundaries to avoid vowel-initial syllables (CVC VC VC → CV.C-V.C-VC)
Insertion of a glottal stop when necessary to avoid vowel-initial syllables

An example of these various processes together:

In the following and similar analyses, the normal-form pronunciation is given as the phonetic equivalent of the given phonemic form, although the intermediate steps may be given if necessary for clarity.

 Prosody 

 Stress 
The position of stress is essentially automatic.  The basic rule is that, proceeding from the end to the beginning of the word, the stress goes on the first encountered syllable of any of these types:

 A heavy syllable: that is, a syllable ending in either a long vowel (CVː), a long vowel and a consonant (CVːC), or two consonants (CVCC)
 A non-final light syllable that directly follows a heavy syllable
 A non-final light syllable that directly follows two light syllables (i.e. ...CVCVˈCVCV...)
 The first syllable of the word

Because the stress is almost completely predictable, it is not indicated in phonemic transcriptions (but is given in the corresponding phonetic explication).

 Phonological development 

 Phonemic developmental stages 
 identifies three stages in the phonological acquisition of Egyptian Arabic, ending with completion of the consonant inventory (with the possible exception of ) at approximately age five.

Babbling stage: (~6–10 months)
The sound inventory found in the babbling stage does not technically consist of phonemes, but rather vowel- and consonant-like'' sounds. Therefore, they are not true speech sounds. At this stage  is only produced word-initially (possibly due to speakers’ tendency to insert a glottal stop on words which begin with a vowel). A voiced-voiceless contrast is now apparent in stops and fricatives. Consonant clusters appear but are unstable, often being omitted or simplified (consonant cluster reduction). The newly acquired lateral  is frequently used in place of the flap/trill ~ (lateralization).
The flap/trill ~ and all diphthongs and clusters are acquired, and geminate consonant distinction is stable.

Cross-linguistic comparison and phonological processes 
Egyptian Arabic phoneme acquisition has been chiefly compared to that of English. Egyptian Arabic differs most from English in terms of age of phoneme acquisition: Vowel distinctions appear at an earlier age in Egyptian Arabic than in English, which could reflect both the smaller inventory and the higher functional value of Arabic vowels: The consonantal system, on the other hand, is completed almost a year later than that of English. However, the lateral  is acquired by most Arabic-speaking children by age two, a year earlier than English-speaking children.

Phonological processes 
For children under two, syllable reduction and final consonant deletion are the most common phonological processes. De-emphasis, involving the loss of the secondary articulation for emphatic consonants (e.g., realizing emphatic  as ), may reflect the motoric difficulty of emphatic consonants, which are rare in world languages, as well as their relatively low frequency and functional load in Arabic.

Acquisition of syllable structure 
Most children have mastered all syllable types between the ages of two and three. A preference for three-syllable words is evident (CVːC syllables being the most frequently produced) and production rarely exceeds four syllables. Simplification processes like those detailed above may occur to reduce CVCC syllables to CVːC or CVC syllables; however, when children change the syllable structure, they preserve the prosodic weight of the altered syllable in order to maintain stress relations.

See also 
 Egyptian Arabic
 Riqaa script
 Ottoman Turkish language

Notes

References 

Phonology
Arabic phonology